This is a list of apocalyptic feature-length films. All films within this list feature either the end of the world, a prelude to such an end (such as a world taken over by a viral infection), and/or a post-apocalyptic setting.

Pre-1950

 The End of the World (1916)
 End of the World (1931)
 Deluge (1933)
 Things to Come (1936)

1950–1959

 Five (1951)
 When Worlds Collide (1951)
 Day the World Ended (1955)
 World Without End (1956)
 The Lost Missile (1958)
 Teenage Caveman (1958)
 On the Beach (1959)
 The World, the Flesh and the Devil (1959)

1960–1969

 Beyond the Time Barrier (1960)
 Last Woman on Earth (1960)
 Battle of the Worlds (1961)
 The Last War (1961)
 The Day the Earth Caught Fire (1961)
 The Creation of the Humanoids (1962)
 Panic in Year Zero! (1962)
 The Day of the Triffids (1962)
 This Is Not a Test (1962)
 La Jetée (1962)
 Ladybug Ladybug (1963)
 Dr. Strangelove or: How I Learned To Stop Worrying and Love the Bomb (1964)
 The Time Travelers (1964)
 Fail-Safe (1964)
 The Last Man on Earth (1964)
 Crack in the World (1965)
 The War Game (1966)
 Daleks – Invasion Earth: 2150 A.D. (1966)
 In the Year 2889 (1967)
 Late August at the Hotel Ozone (1967)
 Night of the Living Dead (1968)
 Planet of the Apes (1968)
 Il seme dell'uomo (1969)
 The Bed-Sitting Room (1969)

1970–1979

 Colossus: The Forbin Project (1970)
 Beneath the Planet of the Apes (1970)
 No Blade of Grass (1970)
 Gas-s-s-s (1970)
 The Andromeda Strain (1971)
 Escape from the Planet of the Apes (1971)
 The Omega Man (1971)
 Glen and Randa (1971)
 Beware! The Blob (1972)
 A Thief in the Night (1972)
 Conquest of the Planet of the Apes (1972)
 A Distant Thunder (1972)
 Silent Running (1972)
 Soylent Green (1973)
 Battle for the Planet of the Apes (1973)
 Genesis II (1973)
 The Final Programme (The Last Days of Man on Earth) (1973)
 Zardoz (1974)
 Phase IV (1974)
 Planet Earth (1974)
 Where Have All The People Gone? (1974)
 Black Moon (1975)
 The Noah (1975)
 The Ultimate Warrior (1975)
 A Boy and His Dog (1975)
 The Late, Great Planet Earth (1976)
 Logan's Run (1976)
 Damnation Alley (1977)
 End of the World (1977)
 Holocaust 2000 (1977)
 Wizards (1977)
 The Last Wave (1977)
 Dawn of the Dead (1978)
 Invasion of the Body Snatchers (1978)
 Mad Max (1979)
 Quintet (1979)
 Ravagers (1979)
 The Shape of Things to Come (1979)
 Stalker (1979)

1980–1989

 Virus (1980)
 Phoenix 2772 (1980)
 Image of the Beast (1981)
 Escape from New York (1981)
 Mad Max 2 (The Road Warrior) (1981)
 Malevil (1981)
 Battletruck (1982)
 World War III (1982)
 Café Flesh (1982)
 Blade Runner (1982)
 The Day After (1983)
 Le Dernier Combat (1983)
 Stryker (1983)
 Testament (1983)
 The Prodigal Planet (1983)
 Exterminators of the Year 3000 (1983)
 Das Arche Noah Prinzip (1984)
 When the Wind Blows (1984)
 Sexmission (1984)
 Threads (1984)
 Nausicaä of the Valley of the Wind (1984)
 Night of the Comet (1984)
 The Terminator (1984)
 Day of the Dead (1985)
 The Quiet Earth (1985)
 Mad Max Beyond Thunderdome (1985)
 Radioactive Dreams (1985)
 Def-Con 4 (1985)
 America 3000 (1986)
 Dead Man's Letters (1986)
 Fist of the North Star (1986)
 Land of Doom (1986)
 Solarbabies (1986)
 Steel Dawn (1987)
 Cherry 2000 (1987)
 The Seventh Sign (1988)
 Akira (1988)
 Miracle Mile (1988)
 Hell Comes to Frogtown (1988)
 A Visitor to a Museum (1989)
 The Blood of Heroes (The Salute of the Jugger) (1989)
 Bunker Palace Hôtel (1989)
 Cyborg (1989)
 Millennium (1989)

1990–1999

 By Dawn's Early Light (1990)
 Solar Crisis (1990)
 The Handmaid's Tale (1990)
 Hardware (1990)
 Circuitry Man (1990)
 Terminator 2: Judgment Day (1991)
 Until the End of the World (1991)
 The Rapture (1991)
 Neon City (1991)
 Delicatessen (1991)
 Split Second (1992)
 American Cyborg: Steel Warrior (1993)
 Body Snatchers (1993)
 The Last Border (1993)
 Without Warning (1994)
 Plughead Rewired: Circuitry Man II (1994)
 In the Mouth of Madness (1994)
 12 Monkeys (1995)
 Sentinel 2099 (1995)
 Steel Frontier (1995)
 Tank Girl (1995)
 Judge Dredd (1995)
 Waterworld (1995)
 The Prophecy (1995)
 The Arrival (1996)
 Omega Doom (1996)
 Escape from L.A. (1996)
 The End of Evangelion (1997)
 Invasion (1997)
 The Postman (1997)
 Future Fear (1997)
 Last Night (1998)
 The Prophecy 2 (1998)
 Six String Samurai (1998)
 Beowulf (1999)
 Dogma (1999)
 End of Days (1999)
 The Matrix (1999)
 The Omega Code (1999)

2000–2009

 Fail Safe (2000)
 The Last Warrior (2000)
 Left Behind (2000)
 Lost Souls (2000)
 The Prophecy 3: The Ascent (2000)
 On the Beach (2000)
 Titan A.E. (2000)
 Final Fantasy: The Spirits Within (2001)
 Megiddo: The Omega Code 2 (2001)
 A.I. Artificial Intelligence (2001)
 Blue Gender:The Warrior (2002)
 28 Days Later (2002)
 The Time Machine (2002)
 Reign of Fire (2002)
 Resident Evil (2002)
 Returner (2002)
 The Animatrix (2003)
 Terminator 3: Rise of the Machines (2003)
 Dragon Head (2003)
 Dreamcatcher (2003)
 Save the Green Planet! (2003)
 Time of the Wolf (2003)
 The Matrix Revolutions (2003)
 The Matrix Reloaded (2003)
 Dawn of the Dead (2004)
 The Day After Tomorrow (2004)
 Shaun of the Dead (2004)
 Resident Evil: Apocalypse (2004)
 Æon Flux (2005)
 The Prophecy: Forsaken (2005)
 War of the Worlds (2005)
 Land of the Dead (2005)
 Supervolcano (2005)
 Children of Men (2006)
 Idiocracy (2006)
 Right at Your Door (2006)
 Solar Attack (2006)
 Southland Tales (2006)
 Planet Terror (2007)
 Tooth and Nail (2007)
 The Signal (2007)
 The Invasion (2007)
 Resident Evil: Extinction (2007)
 20 Years After (2007)
 The Dark Hour (2007)
 28 Weeks Later (2007)
 I Am Legend (2007)
 Babylon A.D. (2008)
 Blindness (2008)
 Resident Evil: Degeneration (2008)
 WALL-E (2008)
 Daybreakers (2008)
 Doomsday (2008)
 City of Ember (2008)
 The Happening (2008)
 Pontypool (2008)
 The Road (2009)
 Pandorum (2009)
 Watchmen (2009)
 9 (2009)
 Knowing (2009)
 Zombieland (2009)
 2012 (2009)
 Terminator Salvation (2009)
 Battlestar Galactica: The Plan (2009)
 Happy End (2009)
 Carriers (2009)
 Earth 2100 (2009)

2010–2019

 Juan of the Dead (2010)
 Monsters (2010)
 Stake Land (2010)
 Skyline (2010)
 Vanishing on 7th Street (2010)
 Legion (2010)
 Maximum Shame (2010)
 The Book of Eli (2010)
 Resident Evil: Afterlife (2010)
 4:44 Last Day on Earth (2011)
 Deadheads (2011)
 Perfect Sense (2011)
 The Darkest Hour (2011)
 The Day (2011)
 The Divide (2011)
 Melancholia (2011)
 Hell  (2011)
 Rise of the Planet of the Apes (2011)
 The Hunger Games (2012)
 Seeking a Friend for the End of the World (2012)
 Take Shelter (2011)
 5 Shells (2012)
 Dredd (2012)
 It's a Disaster (2012)
 Battle: Los Angeles (2012)
 Resident Evil: Retribution (2012)
 Resident Evil: Damnation (2012)
 Cloud Atlas  (2012)
 Cockneys vs Zombies (2012)
 Rapture-Palooza (2013)
 The Colony (2013)
 These Final Hours (2013)
 This Is the End (2013)
 After the Dark (2013)
 After Earth (2013)
 Los Últimos Días (2013)
 Antisocial (2013)
 Snowpiercer (2013)
 Oblivion (2013)
 Warm Bodies (2013)
 World War Z (2013)
 Edge of Tomorrow (2013)
 The World's End (2013)
 The Host (2013)
 Goodbye World (2013)
 Die Gstettensaga: The Rise of Echsenfriedl (2014)
 Wyrmwood: Road of the Dead (2014)
 The Rover (2014)
 Zodiac: Signs of the Apocalypse (2014)
 X-Men: Days of Future Past (2014)
 Young Ones (2014)
 Aftermath (2014)
 The Maze Runner (2014)
 Dawn of the Planet of the Apes (2014)
 Interstellar (2014)
 The Last Survivors (2014)
 Noah (2014)
 Scouts Guide to the Zombie Apocalypse (2015)
 Turbo Kid (2015)
 Z for Zachariah (2015)
 The End of the World and the Cat's Disappearance (2015)
 Extinction (2015)
 Hidden (2015)
 Air (2015)
 Into the Forest (2015)
 JeruZalem (2015)
 The Survivalist (2015)
 Attack on Titan (2015)
 Terminator Genisys (2015)
 Maze Runner: The Scorch Trials (2015)
 Mad Max: Fury Road (2015)
 Maggie (2015)
 10 Cloverfield Lane (2016)
 Train to Busan (2016)
 Seoul Station (2016)
 I Am a Hero (2016)
 The Fifth Wave (2016)
 Cell (2016)
 Day of Reckoning (2016)
 The Girl with All the Gifts (2016)
 Diverge (2016)
 The Northlander (2016)
 Stephanie (2017)
 It Comes at Night (2017)
 War for the Planet of the Apes (2017)
 Resident Evil: The Final Chapter (2017)
 Resident Evil: Vendetta (2017)
 Everything Beautiful Is Far Away (2017)
 Bokeh (2017)
 Blade Runner 2049 (2017)
 Cargo (2017)
 Deep (2017)
 Bird Box (2018)
 Blue World Order (2018)
 The Domestics (2018)
 How It Ends (2018)
 I Think We're Alone Now (2018)
 In My Room (2018)
 Maze Runner: The Death Cure (2018)
 Mortal Engines (2018)
 The Night Eats the World (2018)
 Patient Zero (2018)
 A Quiet Place (2018)
 Scorched Earth (2018)
 What Still Remains (2018)
 Blood Quantum (2019)
 Zombieland: Double Tap (2019)
 The Wandering Earth (2019)
 The Silence (2019)
 Io (2019)
 Terminator: Dark Fate (2019)
 Light of My Life (2019)
 The Lego Movie 2: The Second Part (2019)

2020-2029 
 2067 (2020)
 #Alive (2020)
 Alone (2020)
 Friend of the World (2020)
 Greenland (2020)
 Love and Monsters (2020)
 Peninsula (2020)
 The Midnight Sky (2020)
 Songbird (2020)
 How It Ends (2021)
 Army of the Dead (2021)
 Awake (2021)
 Don't Look Up (2021)
 Quarantine (2021)
 Silent Night (2021)
 The Tomorrow War (2021)
 Finch (2021)
 Mother/Android (2021)
 The Matrix Resurrections (2021)
 The Mitchells vs. The Machines (2021)
 A Quiet Place Part II (2021)
 Resident Evil: Welcome to Raccoon City (2021)
 Resident Evil: Death Island (2023)

See also
 List of apocalyptic and post-apocalyptic fiction
 List of disaster films
 List of dystopian films

Apocalyptic films